The United States competed at the 1948 Winter Olympics in St. Moritz, Switzerland.

Medalists 

The following U.S. competitors won medals at the games. In the by discipline sections below, medalists' names are bolded. 

| width="78%" align="left" valign="top" |

| width=22% align=left valign=top |

Alpine skiing

Timed events
Men

Women

Combined
The downhill part of the combined events were held concurrently with the individual downhill skiing events. For athletes competing in both events, the same time was used (see table above for the results). The slalom part of the events were held separate from the individual slalom competitions.

Men

Women

Bobsleigh

Cross-country skiing

Figure skating

Individual

Mixed

Ice hockey

The tournament was almost cancelled when rival teams representing the United States arrived. An Amateur Athletic Union (AAU) team was supported by the United States Olympic Committee (USOC), and an Amateur Hockey Association (AHA) team was supported by the Ligue Internationale de Hockey sur Glace (LIHG).  At the center of the issue was amateurism. The International Olympic Committee ruled that neither team could compete, but the Swiss organizing committee allowed the AAU team to march in the opening ceremony, and the AHA team to play unofficially, without being eligible for medals.

Summary

Roster

Tournament

Switzerland 5-4 USA
USA 23-4 Poland
USA 31-1 Italy
USA 5-2 Sweden
Canada 12-3 USA
USA 13-2 Austria
USA 4-3 United Kingdom
Czechoslovakia 4-3 USA

Nordic combined 

The cross-country skiing part of this event was combined with the main medal event, meaning that athletes competing here were skiing for two disciplines at the same time. Details can be found above in this article, in the cross-country skiing section.

The ski jumping (normal hill) event was held separate from the main medal event of ski jumping, results can be found in the table below. Athletes would perform three jumps, of which the two best jumps (distance and form) were counted.

Skeleton

Ski jumping

Speed skating

References

 Olympic Winter Games 1948, full results by sports-reference.com

Nations at the 1948 Winter Olympics
1948
Olympics